The Bachelor is a 1955 film directed by Antonio Pietrangeli, starring Alberto Sordi and Nino Manfredi. It was shown as part of a retrospective on Italian comedy at the 67th Venice International Film Festival.

Plot
The accountant Paolo Anselmi is a confirmed bachelor who finds himself having to be the best man for a friend's business partner. Paolo leaves his old apartment to his friend and new wife and moves to a small guesthouse. Here, he meets a woman, the young hostess Gabriella. The relationship between the two begins to get serious, but he does not want commitment. Then the woman moves to another city. Paolo regains his freedom, but loneliness grips him. He now finds the company of other bachelors boring. His mother continues to insist on him getting married. The bachelor is convinced and begins to seek a wife. Among the "candidates" many have insurmountable defects, such as jealousy, family or physique. Finally he is convinced that is Carla Alberini is suitable and she becomes his companion despite their initial meetings having always ended in furious fights.

Cast
 Alberto Sordi - Paolo Anselmi
 Sandra Milo - Gabriella, hostess
 Nino Manfredi - Peppino
 Madeleine Fischer - Carla Alberini
 Anna Maria Pancani - Lisa
 María Asquerino - Catina
 Fernando Fernán Gómez - Armando
 Pina Bottin - Anna, laundry's director
 Attilio Martella - Michele
 Giovanni Cimara - Mario
 Franca Mazzoni - Norma
 Alberto De Amicis - Antonio
 Francesco Mulé - Cosimo
 Antonella De Luca - Vanda
 Lilli Panicalli - Claudia

References

External links

1955 films
1950s Italian-language films
Films set in Rome
Films directed by Antonio Pietrangeli
1955 comedy films
Italian comedy films
Spanish comedy films
Spanish black-and-white films
Italian black-and-white films
1950s Italian films